Bavin's Gulls or Sloe Grove Islands are a group of islands in the River Thames in England on the reach known as Cliveden Deep above Boulter's Lock, near Maidenhead, Berkshire.  This reach of the Thames was described by  Jerome K. Jerome in  Three Men in a Boat as "unbroken loveliness this is, perhaps, the sweetest stretch of all the river...".

Bavin's Gulls consists of two large and two small thin wooded strips; they are part of the Cliveden Estate and are owned by  the National Trust. Overnight mooring is permitted on three of the islands  but no mooring or landing is permitted on the fourth which is a nature reserve.

See also
Islands in the River Thames

References

Islands of Berkshire
Landforms of Buckinghamshire
Islands of the River Thames